The 1977 City of Aberdeen Council election took place on 3 May 1977 to elect members of City of Aberdeen Council, as part of that years Scottish local elections.

Election results

References

1977
1977 Scottish local elections
20th century in Aberdeen